Hashim Ali Abdullatif (born 17 August 2000) is a Qatari professional footballer who plays as a midfielder for Qatar Stars League side Al Sadd.

Career statistics

Club

Notes

Honours

Club
Al-Sadd
 Qatar Stars League: 2020-21
 Qatar Cup: 2020, 2021
 Emir of Qatar Cup: 2020
 Sheikh Jassim Cup: 2019
 Qatari Stars Cup: 2019-20

References

External links

2000 births
Living people
Qatari footballers
Al Sadd SC players
Al-Arabi SC (Qatar) players
Al-Rayyan SC players
Qatar Stars League players
Association football midfielders
Qatar under-20 international footballers
Qatar youth international footballers
Qatar international footballers